Colonial America may refer to:

 The Colonial history of the United States
 The Thirteen Colonies of Britain in North America, which declared independence in 1776
 The European colonization of the Americas